The 2012 Ethias Trophy was a professional tennis tournament played on hard courts. It was the eighth edition of the tournament which was part of the 2012 ATP Challenger Tour. It took place in Mons, Belgium between 1 and 7 October 2012.

Singles main-draw entrants

Seeds

 1 Rankings are as of September 24, 2012.

Other entrants
The following players received wildcards into the singles main draw:
  Maxime Authom
  Arthur De Greef
  Yannick Mertens
  Yannik Reuter

The following players received entry as a special exempt into the singles main draw:
  Oleksandr Nedovyesov
  Jan-Lennard Struff

The following players received entry from the qualifying draw:
  Kenny de Schepper
  Evgeny Korolev
  Adrian Mannarino
  Illya Marchenko

Champions

Singles

 Kenny de Schepper def.  Michaël Llodra, 7–6(9–7), 4–6, 7–6(7–4)

Doubles

 Tomasz Bednarek /  Jerzy Janowicz def.  Michaël Llodra /  Édouard Roger-Vasselin, 7–5, 4–6, [10–2]

External links
Official Website

 
Ethias Trophy
Ethias Trophy
Ethias Trophy